Carpolobia is a genus of plants in the milkwort family (Polygalaceae) that are native to Tropical Africa and Madagascar. It was first written about in 1831 by George Don, at which point 4 species were identified. In 1849, the number of accepted species went down to 2. The other 2 became part of the legume family. The two species that remained, C. alba and C. lutea, were described as closely resembling each other. It was initially in the Polygaleae tribe before being split off in 1992 along with the genus Atroxima to form the new tribe of Carpolobieae.

Description
Carpolobia are shrubs, small trees, or lianas. They produce flowers with 5 petals. Its fruit are smooth, drupaceous, and uni- to tri-locular. The fruit's endocarp and exocarp are thin and its mesocarp is fleshy.

Species
As of June 2020, there are 5 accepted species:

Carpolobia alba 
Carpolobia gabonica 
Carpolobia goetzei 
Carpolobia gossweileri 
Carpolobia lutea

References

Polygalaceae
Fabales genera